Feeding the Rat Is a book authored by Al Alvarez, the text explores a central theme of the psychological drive to climb mountains.  In this book, Al Alvarez frequently relates the philosophy and biographical stories of his companion Mo Anthoine to convey the emotional range that can be experienced in a life of mountaineering. Mo was a passionate climber who has been described as equal in skill to more famous mountaineers of the era such as, Chris Bonington, or Doug Scott.

Summary 
The overall focus is on mountaineering adventures with a philosophical air. In Feeding the Rat, Al Alvarez discusses the emotions at the heart of climbing and how a deeper knowledge of the self can be gained through suffering, strife, and challenge. The author leads the reader through a dissection of the spiritual and soulful elements within the sport of mountaineering. Comedic relief is dispersed almost as widely as loose strands are in a frayed rope––there some big falls described in its chapters, such as the ill-fated Ogre mountain expedition.

Structurally, the chapters are not always thematically connected and aren't always about mountaineering which adds a sprinkling of the unexpected, in this sense, the Feeding the Rat breaks from the traditional style of mountaineering books of the period which tended to keep an unwavering focus on expedition experience.  Feeding the Rat doesn't solely focus on mountaineering it also delves into home improvement, running a business making and selling outdoor equipment, as well as, touching on the bonds of friendship.

Chapters 

 Llanberis
 The Dolomites
 Epics
 Tyn-y-Ffynnon
 Road to Roraima
 Feeding the Rat
 The Pleasure Principle
 Snowdon Mouldings
 The Mission
 The Old Man of Hoy
 Everest

Reception and notable reviews 
Feeding the Rat has been a literary staple amongst the climbing and mountaineering community, and is heralded as an effective means to describe the attraction of climbing to non-climbers.  In the same year of its release the book was praised in a New Yorker profile. Feeding the rat remains in print.

Unconventional book title 
The name derives from a phrase Mo Anthoine commonly uses to describe his need to go climbing, he calls it "feeding the rat". A quote from the book describes the title "That's why I like feeding the rat. It's a sort of annual check-up on myself. The rat is you, really. It's the other you, and it's being fed by the you, you think you really are". A related quote by Mo Anthoine and included in the book is as follows, "To snuff it without knowing who you are and what you are capable of, I can't think of anything sadder than that."

References

Climbing books
Mountaineering books
1988 non-fiction books
English non-fiction books